Margin Walker is the second EP by the American post-hardcore band Fugazi. It was originally released in June 1989 on vinyl and again in the same year on the compilation release 13 Songs along with the debut EP Fugazi. The 12" vinyl went out of print, but was remastered and reissued by Dischord Records in October 2009.

Background 
Margin Walker was recorded at Southern Studios in London, where Fugazi had finished their first European tour. It was produced by John Loder who was the engineer for several underground artists, including anarcho-punk band Crass which greatly influenced Fugazi. Originally intended to be their first studio album, Margin Walker was released as an EP due to what the members perceived as sub-par performances caused by the exhausting tour.

Reception 
According to Trouser Press, the EP "illustrates just how far Fugazi’s four have traveled from their hardcore beginnings. [...] in MacKaye’s melodic guitar work, the tight, fluid rhythm section, the incisive lyrics and the sharply arranged vocal exchanges." "Continuing to develop the stylings he began with Minor Threat," it continues, "MacKaye manages to make the expletives in the vigorously monotonal, part spoken “Promises” sound somewhat eloquent." Andy Kellman of AllMusic called it an "equally excellent follow-up to the Fugazi EP". Margin Walker was also voted the 2nd best EP of the year in the 1989 Pazz & Jop poll, behind Lucinda Williams' Passionate Kisses.

In a 2014 retrospective piece on 13 Songs, Washington City Paper's Brandon Gentry writes that "[w]hile Margin Walker sounds more polished than Fugazi, it doesn’t lack in intensity or intelligence. The title track’s stunray guitar and elastic bass lines are the ideal backdrop for MacKaye’s and Picciotto’s traded lyrical barbs. “And the Same” combines slashing chords and shouted invective into a scathing diatribe against racism and retrograde thinking. “Promises” is an insightful meditation on trust, betrayal, and the acceptance of disappointment."

Covers

"Margin Walker" was covered live by Wild Flag. "Provisional" was covered by The Dirty Nil as a b-side to their "No Weaknesses" single. Ryan Adams covered the track "Promises" live.

Track listing

Credits
 Ian MacKaye – vocals & guitar
 Guy Picciotto – vocals
 Joe Lally – bass
 Brendan Canty – drums

References

Fugazi EPs
1989 EPs
Dischord Records EPs
Albums produced by John Loder (sound engineer)